Shooting Robert King  is a 2008 documentary film directed by Richard Parry. It documents photojournalist Robert King over 15 years and through 3 different war zones. The film splices footage from his time working in war zones with footage of him home with his family in Tennessee.

Shooting Robert King won a Ron Tibbett Excellence in Filmmaking Award at Indie Memphis Film Festival in 2009.

Reception
The film holds a 100% rating, based on 5 reviews at Rotten Tomatoes.

References

External links
 
 
 

2008 films
British documentary films
2000s English-language films
2000s British films